Limerodops is a genus of ichneumon wasps in the family Ichneumonidae. There are about five described species in Limerodops.

Species
These five species belong to the genus Limerodops:
 Limerodops belangeri (Cresson, 1877) c g b
 Limerodops elongatus (Brischke, 1865) c g
 Limerodops mariannae Heinrich, 1961 c g b
 Limerodops subsericans (Gravenhorst, 1820) c g
 Limerodops unilineatus (Gravenhorst, 1829) c g
Data sources: i = ITIS, c = Catalogue of Life, g = GBIF, b = Bugguide.net

References

Further reading

External links

 

Ichneumoninae